Nuevo Progreso may refer to:

Guatemala
 Nuevo Progreso, San Marcos
Mexico
 Nuevo Progreso, Campeche
 Nuevo Progreso, Nuevo Laredo, Tamaulipas
 Nuevo Progreso, Río Bravo, Tamaulipas
 Nuevo Progreso, Veracruz
 Plaza Nuevo Progreso, bullring in Guadalajara, Jalisco